Beijing apm, also known as Xindong'an Plaza, is a shopping mall and office building at Wangfujing, Beijing, China. It is a commercial property developed by Sun Hung Kai Properties.

The building was built on the site of the old Dong'an Department Store and opened in 1998. In 2001, the building was voted as one of Beijing's Top 10 Great Buildings in the 1990s.

The mall will be accessible via Jinyu Hutong station on Beijing Subway Line 8 in late 2021.

See also
apm (Hong Kong)

References

External links

Official website of Beijing apm

Buildings and structures in Beijing
Office buildings completed in 1998
Shopping malls in Beijing
Sun Hung Kai Properties